Arcade Smash Hits is a video game compilation published by Virgin Games and released in 1992 for the Master System. The game is a compilation of three games in one cartridge. In 1996, Sega released a similar title for the Sega Genesis and Game Gear called Arcade Classics, but with versions of Pong instead of Breakout.

Gameplay
The compilation contains three classic arcade games to play: Centipede, Breakout and Missile Command. They are ported from the Atari 2600 games made in 1982, 1978 and 1981 respectively. However the games were updated to allow one or two players (alternating) and make use of digitized voices.

Reception

The compilation was negatively reviewed by Mean Machines magazine mainly for the slow responsiveness of the games and the lack of new features.

References

External links

1992 video games
Sega video games
Master System games
Master System-only games
Atari video game compilations
Video games developed in the United Kingdom
Video games scored by Matthew Simmonds